Kerrobert Airport  is located adjacent to Kerrobert, Saskatchewan, Canada.

See also 
List of airports in Saskatchewan

References

External links 
COPA Places to Fly page

Registered aerodromes in Saskatchewan